The 2020–21 Washington State Cougars women's basketball team represented Washington State University during the 2020–21 NCAA Division I women's basketball season. The Cougars, led by third year head coach Kamie Ethridge, played their home games at the Beasley Coliseum as members of the Pac-12 Conference.

Previous season
The 2019–2020 edition of the WSU Courgars women's basketball team finished with a record of 11 wins and 20 losses. The Cougars finished Pac-12 Conference play with a record of 4 wins and 14 losses. This resulted in an 11th-place finish in the regular season conference standings. In the 2020 Pac-12 Conference women's basketball tournament the Cougars were defeated by the Oregon State Beavers in the tournament's first round.  The NCAA tournament and WNIT were cancelled due to the COVID-19 outbreak.

Roster

Schedule

Source:

|-
!colspan=6 style=| Regular Season

|-
!colspan=6 style=| Pac-12 Women's Tournament

|-
!colspan=6 style=| NCAA Women's Tournament

Rankings
2019–20 NCAA Division I women's basketball rankings

See also
 2020–21 Washington State Cougars men's basketball team

References

Washington State Cougars women's basketball seasons
Washington State
2020 in sports in Washington (state)
Washington State